Gernot Krinner (born 1 April 1967) is a retired Austrian football striker.

References

1967 births
Living people
Austrian footballers
Grazer AK players
SK Vorwärts Steyr players
FC Tirol Innsbruck players
FK Austria Wien players
Austrian Football Bundesliga players
Association football forwards
Footballers from Styria
People from Voitsberg